Gideon Edward Smith (July 13, 1889 – May 6, 1968), sometimes referred to as G. E. Smith, was an American football player and coach.

Smith played college football at Michigan Agricultural College (MAC), now known as Michigan State University, from 1913 to 1915.  He was the first African-American varsity athlete in any sport at MAC.

Smith also played one game of professional football while still attending MAC.  He appeared as a tackle in one game for the Canton Bulldogs of the Ohio League, becoming one of the first African-Americans to play professional football. He played for the Bulldogs as a late fourth-quarter substitute on November 28, 1916 against their rivals, the Massillon Tigers. During that game he made a game-saving fumble recovery that preserved a 6–0 Canton victory over the Tigers for the "state championship."  Smith was the last African-American to play professional football exclusively prior to the formation of the National Football League.

After graduating from MAC in 1916, Smith became a teacher at the West Virginia Collegiate Institute, now known as West Virginia State University.  He also served in 1920 as a teacher at the Virginia State College for Negroes—now known as Virginia State University—in Matoaca, Virginia.

In 1921, Smith became the head football coach at Hampton Institute, now known as Hampton University, in Hampton, Virginia.  He remained the head football coach at Hampton until 1940, compiling a 97–46–12 record, including six one-loss seasons and two undefeated seasons in 1926 and 1931.  His 1931 team outscored opponents 187 to 6. His 97 wins were the most in school history at that time, and currently rank second only behind Joe Taylor, who concluded his 16th season at Hampton in 2007 with 136 victories. Smith's teams are featured 10 times out of the top 12 on the list for fewest points allowed in a season. His 20 years leading Hampton still stand as the longest coaching tenure in program history.

Smith died on May 6, 1968, at Veterans Administration Hospital in Salem, Virginia, following a long illness. He was inducted into the Hampton Athletics Hall of Fame in 2009.

Head coaching record

References

1889 births
1961 deaths
American football tackles
Canton Bulldogs (Ohio League) players
Hampton Pirates football coaches
Michigan State Spartans football players
Virginia State Trojans football coaches
Players of American football from Virginia
African-American coaches of American football
African-American players of American football
20th-century African-American people